Turkey cut its squad to 14 players on 18 August 2017.

|}
| style="vertical-align:top;" |
 Head coach
 Ufuk Sarıca
 Assistant coach
 Ertuğrul Erdoğan
 Erdem Can
 Arda Demirbağ

Legend
Club – describes lastclub before the tournament
Age – describes age on 31 August 2017
|}

Exhibition games

References

EuroBasket 2017
Turkey national basketball team
2017–18 in Turkish basketball